Mariya Andreyevna Andreyeva (born 12 July 1986) is a Russian theater and film actress. She is best known for her performance as Yulia in Soulless (2011).

Biography
In 2007 she graduated from the Theater School Shchepkin (course Olga Solomina, Yuri Solomin) and was accepted into the troupe of the Maly Theatre, where she worked until 2010. She is currently working in the theater "Pyotr Fomenko Workshop" (between 2007–2010 she was in the trainee group). She starred in the film "Nostalgia for the Future", "The Book of Masters" and "Soulless".

Maria Andreyeva was featured on the cover of magazine "Teatral" in December 2009, and an interview was published with the actress.

Roles in theater
  Children Vanyushin's by Sergei Naydenov 
 Pygmalion by George Bernard Shaw
 2007 -  The Power of Darkness by Leo Tolstoy. Director: Yuri Solomin as Marina
 2009 -  Moliere  (The Cabal of Hypocrites) as Bulgakov. Director: Vladimir Dragunov as Armande Bejart, actress
 Through the Looking-Glass (The Red Queen, the Fawn and the Tiger Lily)
 Gifts by Vladimir Nabokov as Zinaida
 Heartbreak House as Ellie Dan 
 Auburn as Irina 
 Tale of Arden as Rosalinda
 2014 - Olympia by Olga Mukhina.  Director: Yevgeny Tsyganov as Katya

Selected filmography

References

External links 

1986 births
Living people
21st-century Russian actresses
Russian film actresses
Russian television actresses
Russian stage actresses
People from Kropyvnytskyi